Remniku is a village in Alutaguse Parish, Ida-Viru County, in northeastern Estonia. It is located on the northern shore of Lake Peipus. Remniku had a population of 59 in 2000.

In 1990–1994, a border guard training centre was situated in Remniku.

References

 

Villages in Ida-Viru County